Davis Cheek (born February 26, 1999) is an American football quarterback for the New Orleans Breakers of the United States Football League (USFL). He signed with the Carolina Panthers of the National Football League (NFL) as an undrafted free agent following the 2022 NFL Draft, but was released prior to the season before resigning during the season. He played college football at Elon.

Cheek is the Elon's second all-time leader in career passing yards (8,548), attempts (1,149), completions (701), touchdown passes (51), and first all-time leader in career completion percentage (66.8%).

Early life and high school career
Cheek was born on February 26, 1999. He was raised in Matthews, North Carolina and attended David W. Butler High School.

As a junior, Cheek led Butler High to a 9–2 (5–1 in conference) record and a playoff birth while throwing for 2,108 yards and 16 touchdowns, he was named as an all-conference selection. The team lost to Mallard Creek High School 35–30 in the second round of the playoffs.

As a senior, Cheek led Butler to an improved 10–1 (6–0 in conference) record, scoring 40+ points in seven out of eleven games that year. After beginning the playoffs with a home 63–0 win against McDowell High School, Cheek beat Mallard Creek 42–28 after they had beaten Butler earlier in the season. Cheek and Butler's season ended against Julius L. Chambers High School in a 50–49 loss. Cheek rushed for one touchdown and threw for another five, one of which came in overtime to give Butler a 49–42 lead. Chambers scored in response and got the two-point conversion for the win.

College career
Cheek played for Elon University (FCS) for five years from 2017 to 2021. During that time, he threw for 8,548 yards passing and 51 touchdowns.

In 2017, Cheek started in all twelve games for Elon, making his debut against Toledo. He earned CAA Football Rookie of the Week and STATS FCS National Freshman of the Week honors after a win over Rhode Island where he threw for 331 yards and three touchdowns. He finished the year being named CAA Football Offensive Rookie of the Year and was a finalist for the Jerry Rice Award after he led Elon to an 8–4 record. 

In 2018, Cheek started the first six games of the season before tearing his ACL in a game against Delaware. He led the team to a 4–1 record before his injury, including a season-high 286 yards and a game-winning touchdown against No. 2 James Madison in a 27–24 Elon win. Prior to the season Cheek was named to the CFPA FCS National Player of the Year Watch List. 

In 2019, Cheek started all eleven games for Elon, leading the team to a 5–6 record. On homecoming night Cheek and Elon played against Williams & Mary that ended in a 31–29 William & Mary victory after five overtime periods, Cheek threw for 247 yards and two touchdowns in the losing effort including a game tying touchdown pass in fifth overtime. He finished the year eighth in the CAA for total offense with 194.8 yards per game and seventh in passing yards per game with 197.7. 

Prior to the 2020 season, Cheek suffered a season-ending injury prior to the team's spring season. Despite being out, Cheek was still selected as CAA Football's Scholar-Athlete of the Year. 

In 2021, Cheek started all eleven games in his return from injury, having the best year of his career statistically he led Elon to a 6–5 record including wins over ranked No. 22 Richmond and No. 25 Rhode Island. Cheek opened the season throwing for 312 yards and two touchdown passes in a losing effort against Wofford. After a win against New Hampshire where Cheek threw 328 yards and two touchdowns, he was named National Offensive Player of the Week. He was named as a finalist for the Walter Payton Award.

Statistics

Professional career

Carolina Panthers
After going undrafted in the 2022 NFL Draft, Cheek was signed by the Carolina Panthers as an undrafted free agent on April 30, 2022. He was waived by the team on July 12, 2022. On October 3, 2022, Cheek entered the first session of the 2022 NFL Alumni Academy.

On October 8, 2022, Cheek signed a contract with the XFL for the upcoming 2023 XFL season.

On December 6, 2022, Cheek re-signed with the Carolina Panthers' practice squad.

New Orleans Breakers
On January 14, 2023, Cheek signed with the New Orleans Breakers of the United States Football League (USFL).

Career statistics

NFL regular season statistics

USFL regular season statistics

Personal life
Cheek is the son of Eric Cheek and Monica Steed.

References

External links
Elon Phoenix bio

1999 births
Living people
Players of American football from North Carolina
American football quarterbacks
Elon Phoenix football players
Carolina Panthers players
New Orleans Breakers (2022) players